"I, Robot...You, Jane" is the eighth episode of season 1 of the television series Buffy the Vampire Slayer. The episode was written by staff writers Ashley Gable and Thomas A. Swyden, and directed by Stephen Posey. The episode originally aired on April 28, 1997.

In this episode, Willow accidentally releases the demon Moloch onto the Internet, where he becomes a sentient malware and gains a cult following.

Plot
In Cortona, Italy, in 1418, a circle of priests trap a horned demon (Moloch "the Corruptor") in a book using a magic ritual. The book is sealed in a box, with the head priest expressing the hope that the book will never be read, lest the demon be released upon the world. In the present, the book is delivered to Giles and added to a pile that Willow is scanning into a computer.

Willow tells Buffy that she has formed an online relationship with a boy named Malcolm. As Buffy tries to warn Willow about the dangers of rushing into a relationship with someone she has not seen, Fritz, a geeky student, is instructed by Moloch, via the computer he is working on, to keep watch on Buffy. Later, when Xander asks Willow if she will accompany him to the Bronze, she passes, preferring to talk to Malcolm. When Willow arrives late the next day, Buffy finds that she missed classes to talk to "Malcolm". Suspecting that Malcolm might be catfishing Willow, Buffy asks Dave for help in finding out Malcolm's real identity, but his angry response causes her to suspect that he is Malcolm. When Buffy asks Giles for help, he confesses he cannot help her much as he finds technology to be intimidating.

Willow becomes suspicious of Malcolm after she learns that he knows Buffy was kicked out of her old school, and logs off the conversation. Back at the library, Giles discovers that Moloch's book is blank.

Outside of school, Dave tells Buffy that Willow wants to talk to her in the girls' locker room. At the last minute, Dave has a change of heart and warns Buffy that she is about to be electrocuted. In the library, Giles tells Buffy and Xander that demons can be imprisoned in books; if the books are read aloud, the demons are set free. Giles also explains that Moloch is an extremely powerful and seductive demon, winning his victims over with false promises of love, glory and power. Buffy and Giles realize that there is no limit to the destruction that a demon could do through the Internet.

After they find Dave's body, Xander and Buffy go to Willow's house, and Buffy tells Giles to ask the computer teacher Jenny Calendar for help, hoping that between his knowledge of demons and her knowledge of computers, they can reimprison Moloch. Willow is kidnapped by Fritz. Giles seeks help from Jenny, and is surprised that she is already aware of the demon in the Internet. A robotic incarnation of Moloch crashes through a wall and attacks Buffy, Willow and Xander. After a brief battle, Buffy tricks Moloch into punching an electrical power line, causing his body to explode and, presumably, destroying him for good.

The next day, Buffy, Willow and Xander joke about how the Hellmouth is screwing with their love lives, before seriously wondering if they will ever find true happiness.

Broadcast and reception
"I, Robot... You, Jane" was first broadcast on The WB on April 28, 1997. It received a Nielsen rating of 2.3 on its original airing.

Noel Murray of The A.V. Club was critical of the episode, giving it a grade of D+ because it was "corny, tonally off and lacking even the illusion of depth that other slack episodes have provided in Season One". He felt that it was "frustrating in its lack of extra levels, because there are so many places that episode could've gone", and also found some "odd" things about the episode, such as the sudden appearance of other students in the library. However, he was positive towards the final scene and Ms. Calendar. DVD Talk's Phillip Duncan was more positive, writing that "What could have easily been a silly plot is made all the better with an excellent set-up, the introduction of another key player, and the continued focus on characters other than Buffy." A review from the BBC was also positive, writing, "Although the plot is rather tired and seems to belong to the Cyberspace-obsessed eighties, it's given a unique Buffy The Vampire Slayer spin or three to create a very satisfying episode." The review praised the focus on Willow and the way Moloch was presented.

References

External links
 

Buffy the Vampire Slayer (season 1) episodes
1997 American television episodes
Television episodes about demons
Television episodes about Internet culture
Television episodes set in Italy
Television episodes about robots
Television episodes about malware